Cornelia (c. 97 – c. 69 BC) was the first or second wife of Julius Caesar, and the mother of his only legitimate child, Julia.  A daughter of Lucius Cornelius Cinna, Cornelia was related by birth or marriage to many of the most influential figures of the late Republic.

Biography

Early life
Cornelia was the daughter of Lucius Cornelius Cinna, one of the most influential politicians at Rome during the conflict between the generals Gaius Marius and Lucius Cornelius Sulla. He held the consulship for a term of four consecutive years, from BC 87 to 84, when he was slain in a soldiers' mutiny. During this period, he espoused the side of Marius, leaving his family exposed to Sulla's wrath on the latter's return in 82.

By his wife, Annia, Cinna had a son, Lucius, and two daughters, conventionally known as Cornelia Major, who married Gnaeus Domitius Ahenobarbus, and Cornelia Minor, the wife of Caesar. The designations Major and Minor were not really part of their names, but were used to distinguish between sisters, who bore the same nomen. Since there were a great many Corneliae at Rome, Caesar's wife is occasionally referred to as Cornelia Cinnae, or "Cinna's Cornelia".

Marriage
Suetonius reports that Caesar and Cornelia were married in the consulate occurring after Caesar lost his father, which occurred in his sixteenth year. In Suetonius' chronology, Caesar was born in 100 BC, placing the death of his father in 85 or 84.  Thus, he probably married Cornelia in 83, when he was about seventeen years old, and she perhaps a little younger.  Their daughter, Julia, was Caesar's only legitimate child, and the only one he acknowledged.

The young Caesar was one of those to whom Sulla turned his attention after returning to Rome.  Although he had taken no part in the government of Marius and Cinna, and done nothing to oppose Sulla's return, Caesar's aunt, Julia, was the wife of Marius; his cousin was the younger Marius, who as consul in 82 was defeated by Sulla, and had taken his own life as the city fell.  Marius and Cinna had appointed the young Caesar to an important priesthood, and by marrying Cinna's daughter, Caesar gained control of a substantial dowry.  Sulla regarded Caesar as a potential rival, and commanded him to divorce Cornelia.

However, neither the deprivation of his priesthood, Cornelia's dowry, and his own inheritance, nor the threat of violence, would induce Caesar to forsake his wife.  He was proscribed, and escaped Rome in disguise, evading capture by regularly changing his place of concealment, and on at least one occasion by bribing the commander of a patrol sent to search for Sulla's enemies.  Eventually Sulla relented, following the intercession of Caesar's numerous friends and kinsmen, and Caesar returned home to Cornelia.

Death
After about thirteen years of marriage, Cornelia died early in her husband's quaestorship, which occurred in BC 69 or 68. Caesar was due to depart for Spain, and had already pronounced the funeral oration of his aunt, Julia, from the rostra, as was customary for elderly Roman matrons. He then gave an oration in honour of Cornelia, which was extraordinary in the case of a young woman, although it later became commonplace. Historically, Cornelia is often stated to have died in childbirth, but this is not confirmed.

Notes

References

Bibliography

 Marcus Velleius Paterculus, Compendium of Roman History.
 Plutarchus, Lives of the Noble Greeks and Romans.
 Gaius Suetonius Tranquillus, De Vita Caesarum (Lives of the Caesars, or The Twelve Caesars).
 Dictionary of Greek and Roman Biography and Mythology, William Smith, ed., Little, Brown and Company, Boston (1849).
 Monroe E. Deutsch, "The Women of Caesar's Family", in The Classical Journal, vol. XIII (1918).
 T. Robert S. Broughton, The Magistrates of the Roman Republic, American Philological Association (1952).
 Matthias Gelzer, Caesar: Politician and Statesman, Peter Needham, translator, Oxford (1968).
 Adrian Goldsworthy, Caesar, Life of a Colossus, Yale University Press (2006).
 Oxford Classical Dictionary, 3rd Edition, Simon Hornblower and Anthony Spawforth, Eds., Oxford University Press (2009).

External links

90s BC births
69 BC deaths
 
Cornelii Cinnae
Deaths in childbirth
Wives of Julius Caesar